In mathematics, Naimark theorem may refer to:

Gelfand–Naimark theorem
Naimark's dilation theorem